Karnataka produces 9,000 metric tons of mulberry silk of a total of 20,000 metric tons of mulberry silk produced in the country, thus contributing to nearly 45% of the country's total mulberry silk. In Karnataka, silk is mainly produced in the Mysore district. It is a patent registered product under KSIC. KSIC is an owner of the Mysore Silk brand.

History
The growth of the silk industry in the Kingdom of Mysore was first initiated during the reign of Tipu Sultan nearly 1780-1790AC. Later, it was hit by a global depression and had to compete with imported silk and rayon. In the second half of the 20th century, it revived and the Mysore State became the top multivoltine silk producer in India. Mysore silk is also known as mulberry silk because the silk cultivators would generally use mulberry leaves for silkworms to feed over.

About
Mysore silk is produced by the Karnataka Silk Industries Corporation Limited (KSIC). The factory was founded in 1912 by Sri Nalvadi Krishnaraja Wodeyar, the Maharaja of Mysore. Initially, the silk fabrics were manufactured & supplied to meet the requirements of the royal family and ornamental fabrics to their armed forces. After India gained independence, the Mysore State Sericulture Dept. took control of the silk weaving factory. In 1980, the factory was handed over to KSIC, a government of Karnataka industry. Today, products include silk sarees, shirts, kurta's, silk dhoti, and neckties. Mysore silk has also received geographical identification.

Process
Mysore Silk factory located in the heart of Mysore is spread across acres of land and is mainly responsible for silk weaving and distribution of silk products. The main source of silk for this factory is from the Ramanagara district in Karnataka which is also the largest market for silk cocoons in Asia. Farmers from various parts of this district market the silk cocoons in this place every day. Silk cocoons are hand picked at this market from KSIC officials, who have expertise in Mysore silk, every day as part of government bidding process and are sent to the raw silk production factory located in T.Narasipura. At this factory, the silk cocoons are boiled to extract threads and converted into thread rolls which are sent to the weaving factory located in Mysore. These threads are used to produce various silk products among which Mysore silk saree is the most popular.

Since the saree zari contains 65% pure silver and 0.65% of gold, it is also one of the most expensive silk saree in India. This has led to production of duplicate Mysore silk saree production and sales by cheating the public in the name of KSIC. To avoid these issues, KSIC has implemented unique id, hologram based design and unique identification barcode woven on each Mysore Silk saree produced in its factory.

See also
 Art silk
 Bombyx mori
 History of silk
 Mommes
 Rayon
 Silk in the Indian subcontinent
 Silk Road
 Spider silk
 Tenun Pahang Diraja
 Ilkal saree
 Mysore Sandal Soap

References

Textile companies of India
Companies based in Mysore
Silk in India
Geographical indications in Karnataka